Jost Oliver Zetzsche (born in Hamburg, Germany) is a German–American translator, sinologist and writer who lives in Oregon.

Biography
Jost Zetzsche currently lives in Reedsport, Oregon with his wife, Kristen, and three children, Hannes, Lara, and Anna.

Zetzsche got his Master of Arts in Chinese Studies and German Linguistics, 1993, at the University of Hamburg (graduated with magna cum laude honors). Afterwards he earned a PhD in the field of Chinese history and linguistics from the same university in 1996. He spent his first years as a professional researching in the field of sinology.

He joined the language industry in 1997. He has led localization projects in many major software, web, and documentation environments. In 1999, he co-founded International Writers' Group.

He is an English-German translator, a consultant in the field of localization and translation, and a writer on technical solutions for the translation and localization industry. He speaks at conferences, delivers lectures and training courses on TEnT (translation environment tools, a term he coined for computer-assisted translation tools).

Works
Translation Matters., 2017.
Found in Translation with Nataly Kelly, 2012.
 A Translator's Tool Box—A Computer Primer for Translators.
"Bibel in China (I): Transkriptionen in den chinesischen Bibelübersetzungen", in China Heute 13 (1994), pages 178–185.
"Bibel in China (II): Transkriptionen von 'Jesus Christus'"", in China Heute 14 (1995), pages 17–19.
 "Bibel in China (III): Terminologische Einflüsse von Denksystemen nichtchristlichen Ursprungs auf das chinesische christliche Vokabular", in China Heute 15 (1995), pages 46–55.
 "Aspekte der chinesischen Bibelübersetzung", i Fallbeispiel China. Beiträge zur Religion, Theologie und Kirche im chinesischen Kontext (pages 29–88), with R. Malek. Nettetal: Steyler Verlag/St. Augustin: China-Zentrum.
«Internationale Konferenz über James Legge (1815–1897)», in China Heute 16 (1997), pages 37–38.
«Tianzhu, Shangdi oder Shen? Zur Entstehung der christlichen chinesischen Terminologie», in Chun (Chinesischunterricht) 13 (1997), pages 23–34.
«Kantonesische Bibel veröffentlicht», in China Heute 16 (1997), pages 74–75.
«Cultural Primer or Gospel? Bible Stories in Contemporary China», in Asian and African Studies 6.2 (1997), pages 217–232.
History of the Union Version: The Culmination of Protestant Missionary Bible Translation in China, Monumenta Serica Monograph Series 45. Nettetal: Monumenta Serica, 1999. (Chinese version: 和合本與中文聖經翻譯. 香港: 國際聖經協會, International Bible Society (H.K.) Ltd., 2002
«The Work of Lifetimes: Why the Union Version Took Nearly Three Decades to Complete», in The Bible in Modern China: The Literary and Intellectual Impact, pages 77–100, with Irene Eber, Knut Walf, Sze-Kar Wan. Monumenta Serica Monograph Series 45. Nettetal: Monumenta Serica, 1999
«Macau, Robert Morrison und die chinesische Bibel», in Macau: Herkunft ist Zukunft, pages 499–514, with Roman Malek. Nettetal: Steyler Verlag/St. Augustin: China-Zentrum
«The Missionary and the Chinese 'Helper': A Re-Appraisal of the Chinese Role in the Case of Bible Translation in China», in Journal of the History of Christianity in Modern China 3 2000, pages 5–20
«Die Übersetzung der Bibel ins Chinesische», in Welt und Umwelt der Bibel. Sonderheft 2: Entlang der Seidenstraße, pages 62–63, 2002
«Indigenizing the 'Name Above All Names': Chinese Transliterations of Jesus Christ», in The Chinese Face of Jesus Christ Vol. 1, pages 141–115, with Roman Malek, Monumenta Serica Monograph Series 50/1. Nettetal: Monumenta Serica, 2002
«Absalom Sydenstricker: A Ruling Minority of One", in The Missionary Kaleidoscope: Portraits of Six China Missionaries (pages 116–152), with Kathleen L. Lodwick, Wah Cheng. The Missionary Enterprise in Asia. Norwalk: EastBridge, 2005
«Gützlaffs Bedeutung für die protestantischen Bibelübersetzungen ins Chinesische», in Karl Gützlaff (1803–1851) und das Christentum in Ostasien, pages 155–171, with Thoralf Klein, Reinhard Zöllner. Collectana Serica. Nettetal: Monumenta Serica, 2005

References

External links
International Writers' Group
Tool Kit newsletter for translators
Tool Kit * Translating Help Systems at TranslatorsCafé

Writers from Hamburg
University of Hamburg alumni
German sinologists
German translators
Chinese–German translators
English–German translators
German expatriates in the United States
Writers from Oregon
Living people
German male non-fiction writers
Year of birth missing (living people)